Großkirchheim is a town in the district of Spittal an der Drau in the Austrian state of Carinthia.

Geography
Großkirchheim near the Großglockner of the Hohe Tauern. About 40 percent of the municipality lies in the national park Hohe Tauern.

References

Cities and towns in Spittal an der Drau District
Goldberg Group
Schober Group